Jack C. Rowan (March 22, 1911 – August 31, 1990) was an American football coach and college athletics administrator. He was the third head football coach at Northeast Louisiana State College—now known as University of Louisiana at Monroe, serving for six seasons, from 1958 to 1963, and compiling a record of 20–37.

Head coaching record

College

References

External links
 

1911 births
1990 deaths
Louisiana–Monroe Warhawks athletic directors
Louisiana–Monroe Warhawks football coaches
Northwestern State Demons football coaches
High school football coaches in Louisiana
High school football coaches in West Virginia